Hanover House may refer to:

House of Hanover, a German royal dynasty
The Hanover House, a 2014 independent horror film by Corey Newman
Hanover House (Clemson), a French Huguenot house in South Carolina
Hanover Farm House, a historic home located at Beallsville, Montgomery County, Maryland
Hanover Courthouse, Virginia, a courthouse associated with the Battle of Hanover Court House
Hanover Meeting House, another name for the Polegreen Church

See also
Hannover House, an American entertainment media distributor